Mahmudiyeh (also Romanized as Maḩmūdīyeh; also known as Maḩmūdābād and Maḩmūd Dīvāneh) is a village in Khezel-e Sharqi Rural District, Khezel District, Nahavand County, Hamadan Province, Iran. At the 2006 census, its population was 91, in 17 families.

References 

Populated places in Nahavand County